James Harrison Cravens (August 12, 1802 – December 4, 1876) was a U.S. Representative from Indiana, second cousin of James Addison Cravens.

Biography
Born on August 12, 1802 in Harrisonburg, Virginia, Cravens studied law.
He was admitted to the bar in 1823 and commenced practice in Harrisonburg, Virginia. He moved to Franklin, Pennsylvania, in 1823 and resumed the practice of law. Later, he moved to Madison, Indiana, in 1829 and engaged in agricultural pursuits. He served as a member of the State house of representatives in 1831 and 1832.
He moved to Ripley County, Indiana, in 1833, where he practiced law and managed a farm. He served as a member of the State senate in 1839.

Cravens was elected as a Whig to the Twenty-seventh Congress (March 4, 1841 – March 4, 1843).
He was an unsuccessful candidate of the Free-Soil Party for Governor of Indiana in 1852, and a member of the State house of representatives in 1856.
He was an unsuccessful candidate for election to the attorney generalship of the State in 1856.
He served as lieutenant colonel of the Eighty-third Regiment, Indiana Volunteer Infantry, in the Civil War. During Morgan's raid in Indiana, he and his soldiers were taken captive. He died in Osgood, Indiana, December 4, 1876, and was interred in Versailles Cemetery, Versailles, Indiana.

References

 Retrieved on 2009-5-12

1802 births
1876 deaths
People from Ripley County, Indiana
People of Indiana in the American Civil War
Members of the Indiana House of Representatives
People from Harrisonburg, Virginia
Indiana Free Soilers
Union Army officers
Whig Party members of the United States House of Representatives from Indiana
19th-century American politicians